The 1939 Oklahoma Sooners football team represented the University of Oklahoma in the 1939 college football season. In their third year under head coach Tom Stidham, the Sooners compiled a 6–2–1 record (3–2 against conference opponents), finished in third place in the Big Six Conference, and outscored their opponents by a combined total of 186 to 62.

Two Sooners received All-America honors in 1939: tackle Gilford Duggan and Frank "Pop" Ivy. Five Sooners received all-conference honors: Duggan, Ivy, tackle Justin Bowers, and backs Beryl Clark and Robert Seymour.

Schedule

Rankings

The first AP Poll for 1939 came out on October 16. The Sooners were ranked third. They finished the year ranked 19th.

NFL Draft
The following players were drafted into the National Football League following the season.

References

Oklahoma
Oklahoma Sooners football seasons
Oklahoma Sooners football